Carmine Orlando Tilelli (July 16, 1930 – September 4, 2008) was an American boxer who was the world middleweight champion from 1963 to 1965,. He adopted the name Joey Giardello (the name of a cousin's friend) in order to join the U.S. Army while underage and continued to use the pseudonym throughout his boxing career.

Early life
Giardello was born in Brooklyn, but lived most of his life in the Lower Moyamensing area of South Philadelphia. He joined the U.S. Army while underage towards the end of World War II, using a cousin's friend's name, and volunteered for airborne duty. During his military time, he took part in Army boxing matches, and after his discharge in 1948, began boxing professionally. He continued to use the name he had enlisted under, Joey Giardello, in his boxing career.

Pro career
During his early career, he had a scuffle at a gas station which cost him $100,000 in prize fight money and five months in jail.

As a pro, he quickly racked up an 18–0–1 record in his first 19 fights while facing less-than-stellar opposition. He fought just three men who had previously won a fight during that time. It caught up with Giardello on January 16, 1950, when he was handed his first defeat by Joe DiMartino, a journeyman with a 6–10 record.

After that embarrassment, he began to face better opposition and by 1951, was beating some of the better middleweight boxers on the Philadelphia scene. He continued to do so for years afterward, but was blocked from receiving a shot at the world championship by the underworld figures who controlled the sport at that time. On June 4, 1954, Los Angeles-based heavyweight boxer Clarence Henry, who was managed by Mafiosi Frank "Blinky" Palermo, was arrested in New York City for attempting to bribe Oakland, California middleweight Bobby Jones to throw his June 11 Madison Square Garden match with Giardello. Henry allegedly offered $15,000 to Jones to throw the fight. Once the third-ranked heavyweight contender, Henry was released after posting $2,000 bail and subsequently retired from the ring. Giardello beat Jones in a close decision.

Giardello's fight vs. Billy Graham was the next significant bout. The decision first was awarded to Graham, then later reversed to a decision in favor of Giardello, then reversed again, some time later, in favor of Graham. This fight is known in boxing lore as "The reversed reversal."

In 1960, Giardello received his first championship opportunity. On April 20, he faced Gene Fullmer for the National Boxing Association version of the world middleweight title. He missed out on the title when he and Fullmer fought to a draw over 15 rounds.

Giardello lost four of his next six fights, but then came back strong with an 8–1–1 record in his next 10, all of which were over some of the biggest names in the division at that time. One of his wins, a 10-round decision over Henry Hank on January 30, 1962, was chosen as Ring Magazine's fight of the year. Then, on June 24, 1963, Giardello upset boxing legend Sugar Ray Robinson, and at the age of 33, was finally named as the No. 1 challenger for the world middleweight title.

On December 7, 1963, Giardello faced Dick Tiger in Atlantic City for the title and won a controversial decision in 15 rounds.

He reigned as world champion for nearly two years, winning four fights during that time. On December 14, 1964, he fought "Hurricane" Rubin Carter in a title defense. In the first three rounds, Carter stalked Giardello and was the aggressor, as the champion looked to stay away from Carter's left hook. In the 4th round, Carter opened a cut over Giardello's left eye and staggered him with several head shots. By the 13th round, Carter had begun to tire, and Giardello began pounding Carter's head and body, which continued through the 15th and final round. Despite being dominated by Carter the first ten rounds, Giardello was awarded a unanimous decision, an event dramatized in the 1999 film The Hurricane.

In a rematch with Dick Tiger on October 21, 1965, the Nigerian won a unanimous decision over Giardello in 15 rounds to regain the belt. Giardello was described as "back pedaling for most of the fight." Giardello fought just four more times over the next two years before retiring.

Life after boxing
After retirement, he went into private business and went back to his real name.
He was an insurance salesman and later joined the Misco International Chemical Company as their New York-Philadelphia-New Jersey distributor. He had married his wife Rosalie in 1950, with whom he had four children. He did work with the intellectually disabled, particularly for St. John of God School Community Services in Westville Grove, New Jersey, where his son, Carman, who had Down Syndrome, lived for ten years. He met the pope and was invited to President John F. Kennedy's Inauguration. With his celebrity and title, he participated in countless fundraising events for the intellectually disabled and contributed his time and talent to the Special Olympics, founded by Eunice Kennedy Shriver. At one event he taught the Special Olympians to jump rope.

He had a small role as a man from "The Syndicate" in the 1975 movie Moonrunners.

In 1996, he was invited to a Hungarian TV talk-show, (Friderikusz show) in which he made appearance in Budapest, Hungary, to celebrate Laszlo Papp's 70th birthday, that was a honorary invitation because of eastern communist block did not let Papp to match with Giardello in 1966, therefore Giardello could keep holding the 2 world titles, while Laszlo Papp was forced by the communist Hungarian government to bring his boxing career to an end.

He later filed a federal lawsuit against Universal Pictures, Beacon Communications and Aloof Films, for unspecified damages, for its "thoroughly false depiction" of his bout with Rubin Carter in Norman Jewison's 1999 film The Hurricane. The case was settled out-of-court and the DVD version of the film included scenes from the actual fight, as well as Jewison's statement that Giardello "no doubt" was a great fighter.

He died on September 4, 2008 in Cherry Hill, New Jersey. He was 78 years old.

Honors
Giardello was inducted into the Philadelphia Sports Hall of Fame in 2009, the 3rd boxer to be inducted after Joe Frazier (2004) and Tommy Loughran (2008).  He was inducted into the International Boxing Hall of Fame in 1993. His career record was 101 wins, 25 losses and 7 draws. He was 5-3-1 against other boxers in the Hall of Fame, including a 2–2 mark against Tiger.

A public statue honoring Giardello is situated in the East Passyunk Crossing section of South Philadelphia.

Professional boxing record

See also
List of middleweight boxing champions

References

External links

1930 births
2008 deaths
Middleweight boxers
American people of Italian descent
World boxing champions
International Boxing Hall of Fame inductees
Boxers from Philadelphia
Sportspeople from Brooklyn
United States Army personnel of World War II
American male boxers
United States Army soldiers
Boxers from New York City
Child soldiers in World War II